is a Japanese word consisting of two kanji: 怪 (kai) meaning "strange, mysterious, rare, or bewitching apparition" and 談 (dan) meaning "talk" or "recited narrative".

Overall meaning and usage
In its broadest sense, kaidan refers to any ghost story or horror story, but it has an old-fashioned ring to it that carries the connotation of Edo period Japanese folktales. The term is no longer as widely used in Japanese as it once was: Japanese horror books and films such as Ju-on and Ring would more likely be labeled by the katakana . Kaidan is only used if the author/director wishes to specifically bring an old-fashioned air into the story.

Examples of kaidan
Banchō Sarayashiki (The Story of Okiku) by Okamoto Kido
Yotsuya Kaidan (Ghost Story of Tōkaidō Yotsuya) by Tsuruya Nanboku IV (1755–1829)
Botan Dōrō (The Peony Lantern) by Asai Ryoi
Mimi-nashi Hōichi (Hōichi the Earless)

Hyakumonogatari Kaidankai and kaidanshu
Kaidan entered the vernacular during the Edo period, when a parlour game called Hyakumonogatari Kaidankai became popular. This game led to a demand for ghost stories and folktales to be gathered from all parts of Japan and China.The popularity of the game, as well as the acquisition of a printing press, led to the creation of a literary genre called kaidanshu. Kaidanshu were originally based on older Buddhist stories of a didactic nature, although the moral lessons soon gave way to the demand for strange and gruesome stories.

Examples of kaidanshu
Tonoigusa, called Otogi Monogatari (Nursery Tales) by Ogita Ansei (1660)
Otogi Boko (Handpuppets) by Asai Ryoi (1666)
Ugetsu Monogatari (Tales of Moonlight and Rain) by Ueda Akinari (1776)

Background of the romanized translation
The word was popularised in English by Lafcadio Hearn in his book Kwaidan: Stories and Studies of Strange Things. The spelling kwaidan is a romanization based on an archaic spelling of the word in kana - Hearn used it since the stories in the book were equally archaic. The revised Hepburn romanization system is spelled kaidan.

When film director Masaki Kobayashi made his anthology film Kwaidan (1964) from Hearn's translated tales, the old spelling was used in the English title.

Plot elements
Originally based on didactic Buddhist tales, kaidan often involve elements of karma, and especially ghostly vengeance for misdeeds.  Japanese vengeful ghosts (Onryō) are far more powerful after death than they were in life, and are often people who were particularly powerless in life, such as women and servants.

This vengeance is usually specifically targeted against the tormentor, but can sometimes be a general hatred toward all living humans.  This untargeted wrath can be seen in Furisode, a story in Hearn's book In Ghostly Japan about a cursed kimono that kills everyone who wears it.  This motif is repeated in the film Ring with a videotape that kills all who watch it, and the film franchise Ju-on with a house that kills all who enter it.

Kaidan also frequently involve water as a ghostly element.  In Japanese religion, water is a pathway to the underworld as can be seen in the festival of Obon.

See also
 Yose
 Glen Grant
 Japanese horror
 Japanese mythology
 Junji Ito
 Obake
 Shigeru Mizuki
 The Unbelievable
 Yōkai
 Yūrei
 Aesop's Fables

External links
Ghoul Power - Onryou in the Movies  Japanzine By Jon Wilks
Tales of Ghostly Japan Japanzine By Zack Davisson
Japanese GhostsMangajin #40 by Tim Screech
Hearn's Kwaidan: Stories and Studies of Strange Things.
A site with several kaidan.
Asian Folklore Studies: The Appeal of Kaidan Tales of the Strange.
Information on The Kaidan Suite, a musical interpretation of kaidan by the Kitsune Ensemble.
Hyakumonogatari.com A website of translated kaidan
TheJapaneseHorror.com Website with several translated Kaidan

Buddhist folklore
Japanese folklore

Japanese words and phrases